Novi Travnik is a town and municipality located in Central Bosnia Canton of the Federation of Bosnia and Herzegovina, an entity of Bosnia and Herzegovina. As of 2013, the town had a population of 9,008 inhabitants, while the municipality had 23,832 inhabitants.

Name
The municipality was called Novi Travnik until 1980, when it was styled Pucarevo after Đuro Pucar. In 1992 the original name was restored.

History
Novi Travnik was founded in 1949 to provide residence for the employees of the newly founded MMK Bratstvo factory, and so it is one of the youngest settlements in the region. As of January 2015, the municipality contains nine National Monuments of Bosnia and Herzegovina, among which are seven stećak necropolises, one mosque and the Necropolis for the victims of Fascism.

Demographics

Novi Travnik Municipality

Novi Travnik proper

Economy

Novi Travnik was founded in 1949 to accommodate the workers of the MMK "Bratstvo" factory. MMK Bratstvo's business grew rapidly and so did the town, resulting in one of the most prosperous towns in the entire Socialist Federal Republic of Yugoslavia and the Eastern Bloc by the late 1980s. MMK "Bratstvo used to employ more than 7,000 people and was the cornerstone of Novi Travnik. The Yugoslav Wars and their consequences altered the way and quality of living in Novi Travnik. Economy of Novi Travnik was greatly dependent on the MMK "Bratstvo" factory which was almost completely destroyed during the war, specially after a Serb air attack on 28 February 1994 (see Banja Luka incident). Today, most of MMK "Bratstvo" was privatized into smaller companies, with the Slovenian Cimos (successor of Tomos) and ADK taking the primary parts of MMK Bratstvo's primary business (forging, car parts industry). A rising trend in Bosnia and Herzegovina was seen in the shoe industry, and Novi Travnik was not excluded from it. There are a dozen companies employing over 1000 people operating in Novi Travnik. In 2015–2016, the municipality administration has designated a new industrial zone outside of the town center to attract foreign investments. HARI Ltd. is a middle-sized retail company headquartered in Novi Travnik. Alongside HARI Ltd, there a few larger retail stores including Agrokor's Konzum and Best and other locally-operating stores.

Notable residents
Marijan Šunjić (1798–1860), born in Bučići – 19th century Bosnian Franciscan, Roman Catholic Bishop (Apostolic Vicar in Bosnia), educator. A street in Novi Travnik and the primary school in Stojkovići were named after him.
Jozo Križanović (1944–2009), born in Vitez – Croat member of the Presidency of Bosnia and Herzegovina (2001–2002), lived in Novi Travnik for a long period of time mostly before the Yugoslav Wars.

References

External links
Official Web page of the Novi Travnik Municipality
Cantonal Court in Novi Travnik
Union of Novi Travnik citizens living in Canada
HARI Ltd.
NoviTravnik.INFO news portal
Drukčiji Radio - local radio station
novitravnik.org by Siba's Friends and Relatives Worldwide (defunct as of 1 March 2017)

Populated places in Novi Travnik
Cities and towns in the Federation of Bosnia and Herzegovina
Municipalities of the Central Bosnia Canton